František Čermák and Michal Mertiňák were the defending champions. Čermák chose not to compete, while Mertiňák chose to play with Johan Brunström.Brunström and Mertiňák lost in the quarterfinals, against Carlos Berlocq and Eduardo Schwank.
This Argentinian pair won the tournament, after defeating Christopher Kas and Philipp Petzschner in the final 7–6(7–5), 7–6(7–6).

Seeds

Draw

Draw

References

External links
 Main Draw

Stuttgart Open
Doubles 2010